The Maude R. Toulson Federal Building is a historic federal government building in Salisbury, Maryland. It is a large  two-story brick building with Classical Revival styling. It has a nine-bay front facade, the center three projecting slightly, and is topped by a low balustrade punctuated by brick piers. The center bays have recessed arches, with windows in the outer of those bays flanking a center entrance. It was built in 1924–25 as a five bay building, with an enlargement in 1934–35; the original design was by the Office of the Supervising Architect under James A. Wetmore. The building initially housed the United States Post Office, and now houses other federal facilities, including the United States District Court for the District of Maryland.

The building was listed on the National Register of Historic Places in 2016.

See also
National Register of Historic Places listings in Wicomico County, Maryland

References

Government buildings on the National Register of Historic Places in Maryland
Buildings and structures in Salisbury, Maryland
Neoclassical architecture in Maryland
National Register of Historic Places in Wicomico County, Maryland